Salt Museum may refer to:

 Salt Museum, Pomorie near Solnitsata — the oldest city in Europe, as well as the Varna Necropolis of Varna culture
 German Salt Museum, in Lüneburg, Lower Saxony, Germany
 Salt Museum (Liverpool, New York), in Liverpool, New York, U.S.
 Strataca, formerly known as Kansas Underground Salt Museum, Hutchinson, Kansas, U.S.
 Taiwan Salt Museum, Tainan, Taiwan
 Ust-Borovaya Saltworks, formerly saltworks and now a museum in Solikamsk, Russia
 Weaver Hall Museum and Workhouse, Northwich, U.K.; formerly known as the Salt Museum
 Zigong Salt Museum, People's Republic of China

See also
 Anchovy and Salt Museum, in L'Escala, Catalonia, Spain